The Iraq national handball team is controlled by the Iraqi Handball Federation and competes in international handball competitions.

Competitive record
 Champions   Runners-up   Third place   Fourth place

Asian Championship

Asian Games

Islamic Solidarity Games

Team

Current squad
A 20-player squad was announced on 16 December for the 2022 Asian Men's Handball Championship in Saudi Arabia.

''Matches and goals are correct as of 16 December 2021.

Head coach: Sherif Moemen

Coaching staff

List of managers
  Champion
  2nd place
  3rd place

Kits
Iraq's traditional home kit is green , with either or white trimmings. The away kit is traditionally blue , with white trimmings.

Home

Away

References

External links
IHF profile

Men's national handball teams
National sports teams of Iraq